Mark P. Fitzgerald (born 1951) is a retired United States Navy admiral. He is the former Commander, United States Naval Forces Europe – Commander, United States Naval Forces Africa and Commander, Allied Joint Force Command Naples. He previously served as Director, Navy Staff from December 2006 to November 2007 and Commander, United States Second Fleet from 2004 until December 2006. He assumed the duties of Commander, United States Naval Forces Europe and Commander, Allied Joint Force Command Naples on November 30, 2007 and assumed the additional duties as Commander, United States Naval Forces Africa on March 26, 2009.

Early life
Fitzgerald was born in Winchester, Massachusetts, and graduated from Northeastern University, where he was a member of the Army ROTC program, in June 1973. He was designated a Naval Aviator in October 1975.

Naval career
He led the first Navy strike on Baghdad during the opening hour of Operation Desert Storm.

During his career, Fitzgerald was assigned as Deputy Commander, Joint Air Force Component Commander for Provide Promise Yugoslav Operations and Assistant Commander for Deny Flight NATO operations (1993). He assumed command of Carrier Air Wing 14 (1994–95) while deployed to the Persian Gulf in  supporting Operation Southern Watch. Fitzgerald's shore tours include VA-174 Landing Signal Officer (1979–82), Naval Maritime Intelligence Center, SPEAR (1991–92), and Executive Assistant to the Supreme Allied Commander, Europe (1996–98). He holds a master's degree in Aeronautical Systems Engineering from the University of West Florida (1975) and attended the Naval War College (1983–84).

Selected for flag rank in September 1998, Fitzgerald's first flag assignment was Deputy Commander, United States Naval Forces Central Command and commanded Joint Task Force Determined Response in Aden, Yemen (2000) in response to the terrorist attack on the guided-missile destroyer . Assuming command of Carrier Group Eight (2001), he led the Theodore Roosevelt Battle Group during Operation Enduring Freedom (2001–2002). He served as Director, Air Warfare and then as Director, Naval Warfare (2003–2004). He then assumed the position of Commander, United States Second Fleet/Commander, Striking Fleet Atlantic in October 2004.

Fitzgerald was relieved as commander of USNAVEUR, USNAVAF & JFC Naples by Admiral Samuel J. Locklear on October 6, 2010.

Awards and decorations

He has logged over 4800 flight hours and has made over 1100 carrier arrested landings from the decks of thirteen aircraft carriers.

References
This article contains information from the United States Navy and is in the public domain.

External links

Official United States Navy Biography 
ADM Mark Fitzgerald's Bio

Living people
United States Naval Aviators
Recipients of the Legion of Merit
Recipients of the Distinguished Flying Cross (United States)
University of West Florida alumni
United States Navy admirals
Northeastern University alumni
Recipients of the Air Medal
1951 births
Recipients of the Defense Superior Service Medal
Recipients of the Defense Distinguished Service Medal
Recipients of the Navy Distinguished Service Medal